Eduard Wohlrat Christian Dietl (21 July 1890 – 23 June 1944) was a German general during World War II who commanded the 20th Mountain Army. He received the Knight's Cross of the Iron Cross with Oak Leaves and Swords.

Military career
Born in 1890, Dietl joined the army on 1 October 1909 as a Fahnenjunker in the 5th Infantry Regiment "Grand Duke Ernst Ludwig of Hesse" of the Bavarian Army in Bamberg. In World War I, he was deployed on the Western Front and he was wounded October 1914 and October 1918. During the Weimar Republic, he joined the Deutsche Arbeiter-Partei, the precursor to the National Socialist German Workers Party, and the paramilitary group Freikorps of Franz Ritter von Epp in 1919. Dietl continued to serve in the German Army and, as a Generalmajor, he helped organise the 1936 Winter Olympics held at Garmisch-Partenkirchen.

Dietl commanded the German 3rd Mountain Division that participated in the German invasion of Norway on 9 and 10 April 1940. Most of this division was landed at Narvik by a German naval force of ten destroyers, commanded by Commodore Friedrich Bonte, subsequently all ten destroyers that had ferried Dietl's troops to Narvik were sunk in the First and Second Battles of Narvik. Dietl's mountaineers withdrew into the hills and later retook the town when Britain abandoned her efforts to evict the Germans from Norway due to German success on the Western Front (the Franco-German border, Luxembourg, Belgium and the Netherlands). Outnumbered by British, French and Polish forces, his skilful defence utilized ammunition, food and sailors (re-drafted as infantrymen) from the sunken ships. This gained him the nickname "The hero of Narvik".

Dietl subsequently commanded German forces in Norway and northern Finland and in Eastern Europe and rose to the rank of Generaloberst, commanding the 20th Mountain Army on the northern Eastern Front, where the results of the German Arctic campaign were disappointing. Dietl initially turned down his promotion, but was convinced to accept the appointment by Generaloberst Alfred Jodl.

Death
On 23 June 1944, the Ju 52 aircraft carrying Dietl, General der Infanterie Thomas-Emil von Wickede, General der Gebirgstruppe Karl Eglseer, Generalleutnant der Gebirgstruppe Franz Rossi and three other passengers crashed in the vicinity of the small village of Rettenegg, Styria. There were no survivors.

Until 1997, the municipality of Ringelai in the Bavarian Forest honoured Dietl with a memorial plaque. In 1977, the site changed into one honoring World War I veteran Albert Leo Schlageter instead. The Bavarian town Freyung honoured Dietl by naming a street General-Dietl-Straße.

Assessment
Dietl was sent to Finland designated to be the "hero in the snow" (to be a counterpart to Rommel who would be the "hero in the sun", also given a secondary theatre leaving the main stage to Hitler). A convinced National Socialist and one of Hitler's favourite generals, he was the first German soldier to be awarded the oak leaves cluster to the Knight's Cross of the Iron Cross - on June 19th 1940. Dietl was also popular among his men and his Finnish allies.

Historian Klaus Schmider remarks that Dietl had too much political baggage to compensate for his admirable record as a mountain troops leader. As a young officer, he refused to assist the civil government in crushing Hitler's abortive Beer Hall Putsch in 1923. He was also a founding member of the NSDAP. What has led the Bundeswehr and the German federal government to reverse honours towards Dietl, though, is his recently discovered view on marriages between Scandinavian women and his soldiers, which was "extreme even by the standards of the Third Reich": after Dietl circulated an order that called Norwegian and Finnish women "racial flotsam", Himmler himself had to intervene to rescind it.

Awards

 Prince Regent Luitpold Medal (Bavaria; 12 March 1911)
 Iron Cross (1914) 2nd class (16 September 1914) & 1st class (3 September 1916)
 General Honour Decoration (Hesse) (16 October 1915)
 Wound Badge (1914) in Silver (1917)
 Bavarian Military Order of Merit 4th class with Swords (18 June 1918) & Commanders Cross (17 August 1933)
 Honour Cross of the World War 1914/1918 (18 January 1935)
 Wehrmacht Long Service Award, 4th class with 1st class (2 October 1936)
 Olympic Games Decoration, 1st class (1936)
 Clasp to the Iron Cross (1939) 2nd class (24 September 1939) & 1st class (15 April 1940)
 Destroyer War Badge (5 November 1940)
 Narvik Shield (21 March 1941)
Knight's Cross of the Iron Cross with Oak Leaves and Swords
Knight's Cross as Generalleutnant and commander of the 3. Gebirgs-Division (9 May 1940)
1st Oak Leaves as Generalleutnant and commanding general of the Gebirgs-Korps Norwegen (19 July 1940)
Swords as Generaloberst and commander in chief of the 20. Gebirgs-Armee (1 July 1944, posthumously)
 Pilot/Observer Badge in Gold with Diamonds(5 January 1941)

 Order of Merit, Commander's Cross with carry permit (Chile; 16 March 1934)
 Order of the White Rose, Grand Cross with Breast Star and Swords (Finland; 9 November 1941)
 Order of the Cross of Liberty 1st class with Star, Oak leaves and Swords (20 January 1944) & Grand Cross (Finland; 28 June 1944)

References
Citations

Bibliography

 Lunde, Henrik O. (2011). Finland's War of Choice. Casemate Publishers, .

External links

 

1890 births
1944 deaths
People from Bad Aibling
Military personnel of Bavaria
People from the Kingdom of Bavaria
German Army generals of World War II
Colonel generals of the German Army (Wehrmacht)
German Army personnel of World War I
German World War II pilots
Gebirgsjäger of World War II
Recipients of the Knight's Cross of the Iron Cross with Oak Leaves and Swords
Recipients of the Order of the Cross of Liberty, 1st Class with a Star
Recipients of the clasp to the Iron Cross, 1st class
Grand Crosses of the Order of the Cross of Liberty
Victims of aviation accidents or incidents in Austria
20th-century Freikorps personnel
Reichswehr personnel
Continuation War